Hearing Voices or hearing voices may be:

 Auditory hallucination
 Curse
 Hearing Voices (album), 2001 audio-recording collection by D. Mahler
 Hearing Voices (TV series), US comedy TV series that premiered in 2014 
 Hearing Voices Movement, a different way of viewing people who hear voices